The following is a list of the persons who have served in the Vermont Senate during the 2005-2006 session:

Members listed by district

Addison
Claire D. Ayer, Democrat
Harold W. Giard, Democrat

Bennington
Richard W. Sears, Democrat
Mark I. Shepard, Republican

Caledonia
Julius D. Canns, Republican note: died during term, February 20, 2005.
George R. Coppenrath, Republican appointed by Governor James Douglas on April 12, 2005 to serve out the term of the late Senator Canns.''
M. Jane Kitchel, Democrat

Chittenden
James C. Condos, Democrat
Edward S. Flanagan, Democrat
James P. Leddy, Democrat
Virginia V. Lyons, Democrat
Hinda Miller, Democrat
Diane B. Snelling, Republican

Essex-Orleans
Vincent Illuzzi, Republican
Robert A. Starr, Democrat

Franklin
Donald E. Collins, Democrat
Sara Branon Kittell, Democrat

Grand Isle
Richard T. Mazza, Democrat

Lamoille
Susan J. Bartlett, Democrat

Orange
Mark A. MacDonald, Democrat

Rutland
Hull P. Maynard, Jr., Republican
Kevin J. Mullin, Republican
Wendy L. Wilton, Republican

Washington
Ann E. Cummings, Democrat
William T. Doyle, Republican
Phillip B. Scott, Republican

Windham
Roderick M. Gander, Democrat
Jeanette K. White, Democrat

Windsor
John Y. Campbell, Democrat
Matt Dunne, Democrat
Peter F. Welch, Democrat

See also
Vermont Senate Districts, 2002-2012
Members of the Vermont House of Representatives, 2005-2006 session

External links
Vermont Senate Biographies

 
Vermont Senate
Vermonst